Lewisia cotyledon is a species of flowering plant in the family Montiaceae known by the common names Siskiyou lewisia and cliff maids. It is native to southern Oregon and northern California, where it grows in rocky subalpine mountain habitat.

Description
It is an evergreen perennial growing from a thick taproot and caudex unit.

The specific epithet cotyledon ("small cup") refers to the shape of the leaves.

Near the flowers are small, pointed bracts tipped with resin glands. The flower has 7 to 13 petals, each about 1.5 centimeters long. The petals may be pale pink with darker veining, whitish with pinkish orange striping, or solid orange to yellow.

Award
This plant and the Sunset group of cultivars have gained the Royal Horticultural Society's Award of Garden Merit.

References

External links

Jepson Manual Treatment
Photo gallery

cotyledon
Flora of California
Flora of Oregon
Flora of the Cascade Range
Flora of the Klamath Mountains
Rogue River-Siskiyou National Forest
Flora without expected TNC conservation status